The 2017 Comoros Premier League is the top level football competition in the Comoros.

Foreign players

29 foreign players from different countries in Africa competed with Comorian clubs in 2017.

Teams
The champions of the three regional leagues of each island will take part in the final tournament to determinate the overall champions.
Champions of Mwali: Belle Lumière (Djoiezi)
Champions of Ndzuwani: Etoile d'or (Mirontsi)
Champions of Ngazidja: Ngaya Club (Mdé) [enter as 2016 champions] (due to other teams being disqualified)

Standings

References

Football leagues in the Comoros
Premier League
Comoros